Karam Singh (1884–1930) was a Sikh historian. His father Jhanda Singh  belonged to traditional Sikh family.

Education
Having studied primary school in Jhabaal, Middle from Khalsa Collegiate School, Amritsar, he attended Khalsa College, Amritsar for higher studies. He had good command in Punjabi, Hindi, Urdu, and English. During his college time while he was nearing to complete his B.A. degree an idea struck him that since aged persons of Maharaja Ranjit Singh times will die soon, why not collect historic narrations from their mouth. He left college to pursue his interest in oral history.

After Education 
In year academic year 1905–06, near dec 2005    he left studies against will of his family members and friends, when he was about to complete his graduation in 3 months. There was no one to support his passion of collecting notes and references. He thought of purchasing daily diaries of Ranjit Singhs’ Darbar available with various sources but no one came to his support . In order to earn livelihood he learned techniques of making blocks and successfully started a poster production business producing pictures of historic heroes and Sikh gurus. He also served Patiala State as Historian . In spite of being a Sikh, he undertook a long travel to Baghdad by being dressed as Muslim. His intention was to travel to Mecca and collect some historic evidences for Guru Nanak's visit there. He was recognised by some of his co travellers and he had to come back from Baghdad. In order to support his expenses he even purchased land and became a successful agriculturist. But simultaneously all along he kept writing articles on Sikh history in Phulwari monthly and published many books of great historic value.

Contributions
He was a prolific author. He wrote extensively and his writings have reached us in the form of numerous notes, diary entries and manuscripts. Some of his published works are as under:
 Banda Bahadur (Punjabi, ਬੰਦਾ ਬਹਾਦਰ)
 Katak Ki Visakh (Punjabi, ਕਤਕ ਕਿ ਵਸਾਖ)
 Jeevan Harnaam Kaur (Punjabi, ਜੀਵਨ ਹਰਨਾਮ ਕੌਰ)
 Jeevan Sada Kaur (Punjabi, ਜੀਵਨ ਸਦਾ ਕੌਰ)
 Banda Kaun tha (Urdu, بندہ کون تھا؟)
 Maharaja Ala Singh (Punjabi, ਮਹਾਰਾਜਾ ਆਲਾ ਸਿੰਘ)
 Gurpurb Nirnay (Punjabi, ਗੁਰਪੁਰਬ ਨਿਰਣੈ)
 Amar Khalsa (Punjabi, ਅਮਰ ਖ਼ਾਲਸਾ)
 Gur Gatha (Punjabi, ਗੁਰ ਗਾਥਾ)

Recognition in Society and death 
On 22 December 1929 at a meeting held at AkalTakhat Amritsar, he established Sikh Historical Society of which he was its secretary. At the same time management of Khasa College wanted to establish Sikh History Research department under him. But he became terribly ill with attack of pneumonia and died on 18 September 1930.  Khalsa College  established this department at his blog ceremony later.

See also
 Sikhism
 Guru Granth Sahib
 Punjabi Language

References

Further reading
 Grover, Bhupinder singh; Karam singh historian Jiwan ate rachna
 Jasbir singh Karam singh historian di itihasik Vartak
 Dard, Hira singh; Karam singh historian di itihasik khoj
 Fulwari Karam singh number, October-1930, Amritsar

External links
 Panjab Digi Library

1884 births
1930 deaths
20th-century Indian historians
Indian Sikhs